The 2002 African Women's Handball Championship was the 15th edition of the African Women's Handball Championship, held in Morocco from 19 to 28 April 2002. It acted as the African qualifying tournament for the 2003 World Women's Handball Championship.

Preliminary round

Group A

Group B

Group C

Second round

Group D

Group E

7–9 placement group

Knockout stage

Bracket

Semifinals

Fifth place game

Third place game

Final

Final ranking

External links
Results on todor66.com

2002 Women
African Women's Handball Championship
African Women's Handball Championship
2002 in Moroccan sport
2002 in African handball
April 2002 sports events in Africa
Women's handball in Morocco
2002 in African women's sport